1.22.03.Acoustic, so named for the date it was recorded live at the Hit Factory, New York, is a live EP by Californian band Maroon 5. It contains acoustic versions of many of the songs on their international hit album, Songs About Jane, as well as two cover songs (The Beatles' "If I Fell" and AC/DC's "Highway to Hell"). The album was released on June 29, 2004.

The album reached No. 42 in the United States and was certified Gold by RIAA and Silver in the United Kingdom.

Critical reception
Giving the EP a C grade, Entertainment Weekly said that "Maroon 5 cement their reputation as kings of the new faceless pop," adding, "Adam Levine...sounds more grating than usual without the much-needed studio gloss."

Track listing

Notes

Charts

Certifications

References 

Maroon 5 live albums
2004 live albums
Maroon 5 EPs
2004 EPs
A&M Octone Records EPs
A&M Octone Records live albums
Live EPs